Mission Acres was a historic rural community in the northern San Fernando Valley. Its historic boundaries correspond roughly with the former community of Sepulveda and present day community of North Hills within Los Angeles, California. The community's western border was Bull Creek, which flowed south out of Box Canyon in the western San Gabriel Mountains near San Fernando Pass.

History
In the 19th century, the site was originally part of the Mission San Fernando Rey de España, and then the Rancho Ex-Mission San Fernando of Andrés Pico, near the Andrés Pico Adobe.

In the early 20th century, it was accessible from the Pacific Electric Red Car San Fernando Line, a route from Downtown Los Angeles to the ranches, orchards, and towns of the northwestern San Fernando Valley.

The real estate firm Patton & Longley Company advertised the future sale of tracts in the San Fernando Mission Lands called Mission Acres in April of 1914. Realtor R. G. Davis, who was recently associated with the Harry H. Culver Company, publicly announced a new affiliation with the Angeles Mesa Land Company as a sales manager in February 1915 as a preliminary to his opening of the Mission Acres tracts which were under preparatory work at the time.

The Mission Acres tracts were opened to the public market by the Angeles Mesa Land Company on Thursday March 4, 1915. As a part of the selling campaign, the company held lectures by experts on poultry culture, squab-raising, Belgian hares and intensive cultivation to prepare potential buyers to use the new land which was advertised as "one of the richest soils sections suburban to Los Angeles." During this time Frank Wiggins, secretary of the Los Angeles Chamber of Commerce owned a 20-acre orange grove in the area along with other notables like Stoddard Jess, vice president of the First National bank who owned a 40-acre lemon grove, and H. R. Wilkinson, secretary of the California Fruit Growers' Exchange who had a 25-acre lemon grove.

The tracts were sold starting at $495 per acre, with $50 being paid up front and $10 per month and free excursions took potential buyers to the site starting on opening day. The main selling points of the site were the fertility of the soil for all kinds of cultivation thanks to the irrigation provided by the new Owens Valley aqueduct as well as its location around the recently completed and spacious boulevard North Sherman Way as well as the Pacific Electric Railway which had stops within the area; this in addition to its proximity to the booming communities of San Fernando and Van Nuys. The company also used the lands' history as part of the San Fernando Mission's land as part of its advertising campaign, describing it as "The 'chosen lands' of the mission fathers". By the first week many sales had been made and several buildings were already under construction. By the end of March $50,000 worth of land in the first single-acre subdivision were sold.

On March 29, 1915, just under a month after the opening of the tracts, the majority of land in the San Fernando Valley were annexed to the City of Los Angeles; this included Mission Acres. The annexation to the city allowed valley farmers to buy surplus water from the Owens Valley aqueduct, this guaranteed a nearly unlimited supply of irrigation water. By the end of October the general manager of the sales campaign of San Fernando Mission Lands, Fred W. Forrester, reported that the  amount of land sold since opening amounted to $125,400 worth, including 247 acres sold to forty different buyers. 28 homes were reported to have been built in Mission Acres and a model demonstration acre was being established for the benefit and guidance of purchasers, the company also continued to hold lectures.

After two years, the value of land sold amounted to over $1,000,000. At this same time, February 1917, the company initiated another active sales campaign, which this time emphasized the high cost of living in the city compared to the new rural communities, and by the first week $15,000 worth of closed sales were made.

As the community began to consolidate, the establishment of a new club house was proposed and $2500 of private subscriptions were donated for its construction. Designed by architect Alexander G. Shaw, a resident of the Mission Acres townsite, it was expected to be completed by the end of April 1917. In June, one of the roads that crossed the site, Orange avenue, had its name changed to Betkouski avenue in honor of the president of the city council, Martin F. Betkouski; this change did not satisfy the residents of Orange avenue and so the Mission Acres Improvement Association asked the council to remove the name and substitute it for Burnet avenue, a name which continues to this day. 

In August 1918, 50 year old resident J. T. Matthews, who was employed as a watchman at the Newhall tunnel was taken into custody, had his work instruments confiscated, and was charged in violation of the espionage act after neighbors complained of his disagreement with Wilson's declaration of war against Germany. In April 1919, the women's committee of Mission Acres reported $1050 in Victory Drive returns.

In May 1925, the chamber of commerce of Mission Acres called a mass meeting to change the town name. Later in 1925, it was announced that the Sepulveda Road was to be extended into the San Fernando Valley through the Sepulveda Pass, creating a direct route from the harbor district and the coastal areas of the Los Angeles Basin to the Valley. This development also became a topic of discussion by the community chamber of commerce. The road known until then as Saugus Avenue would become Sepulveda Boulevard.

In September 3, 1926, the chamber of commerce sent an endorsement of councilman Randall's bond issue proposal to build a trunk line sewer through the San Fernando Valley.

In February 1927, heavy rains caused severe flooding in Valley communities and washed away portions of the unfinished Sepulveda Boulevard.

Residents of Mission Acres renamed the area Sepulveda in 1927.

Shaded by coast live oaks (Quercus agrifolia) and California two-petal ash (Fraxinus dipetala), major products were citrus, eggs, whiteface cattle, quail, truck produce, and gladioli.

See also
San Fernando Valley Historical Society

References

Bibliography 

 

Communities in the San Fernando Valley
History of the San Fernando Valley
Neighborhoods in Los Angeles